Inquirer or The Inquirer may refer to:
The Inquirer, a British technology news website
The Inquirer (Liberia), a Liberian newspaper
The Inquirer (Perth) a newspaper published in Perth, Western Australia, between 1840 and 1855
The Inquirer, a British Unitarianism magazine that has been published since 1842
The Philadelphia Inquirer, an American newspaper 
Philippine Daily Inquirer, a Filipino newspaper
Radyo Inquirer, a Filipino AM Radio Station
The New York Daily Inquirer, a fictional newspaper in the film Citizen Kane
The St. Louis Inquirer, a fictional newspaper in the film Citizen Kane
The Indianapolis Daily Inquirer, a fictional newspaper in the film The Magnificent Ambersons
The US Inquirer, an American newspaper

See also
Enquirer (disambiguation)